Momordicin-28 or 13-hydroxy-28-methoxy-urs-11-en-3-one is a triterpene compound with formula  found in the fresh fruit of the bitter melon (Momordica charantia).

The compound is soluble in ethyl acetate and chloroform but not in petrol.  It crystallizes as fine needles that melt at 121−122 °C. It was isolated in 1997 by S. Begum and others.

See also 
 Momordicin I
 Momordicinin
 Momordicilin
 Momordenol
 Momordol

References 

Triterpenes
Tertiary alcohols
Ketones